Davana Medina is a professional figure competitor from the United States. Medina is one of the more successful figure competitors in the history of the sport, winning the first three Figure Olympia titles from 2003 to 2005.

Biography

Davana was born on January 28, 1974, in Ponce, Puerto Rico. She won her first figure competition, the NPC Bev Francis Atlantic States.

Davana turned professional after winning the first NPC Figure Nationals in 2001. However, there were no professional figure contests until 2003, so she was forced to take a year off from competition. She has been one of the more successful women in figure competition, winning the first three Figure Olympias. Davana competes at 5'7" and 130 pounds. 

After missing the 2006 IFBB Figure Olympia, Medina retired from the sport. On July 14, 2010, it was confirmed that Davana would be making a comeback to the competitive stage as a bikini competitor at the IFBB Europa Hartford Bikini Championships. However, she later pulled out of the competition.

Contest history 

 2001 NPC Bev Francis Atlantic States Figure Championships - 1st
 2001 NPC National Figure Championships - 1st
 2003 IFBB Figure International - 3rd
 2003 IFBB Pittsburgh Pro Figure - 2nd
 2003 IFBB Night of Champions Figure - 1st
 2003 IFBB New York Pro Figure - 1st
 2003 IFBB Figure Olympia - 1st
 2004 IFBB New York Pro Figure - 1st
 2004 IFBB Figure Olympia - 1st
 2005 IFBB New York Pro Figure - 1st
 2005 IFBB Charlotte Pro Figure - 1st
 2005 IFBB Figure Olympia - 1st

See also 
 List of female fitness & figure competitors

References 

1974 births
Living people
Fitness and figure competitors
People from Pequannock Township, New Jersey